1992–1998 (also known as Bedhead: 1992–1998) is a compilation boxed set by the American band Bedhead containing all three of their studio albums as well as early singles and extended plays. It was released on November 11, 2014, by the Numero Group. The boxset was released on compact disc and vinyl formats, with the LP edition being limited to 2,000 copies. Along with the release of this boxset, all three Bedhead albums were also released separately on LP formats; however, this set's fourth disc, Singles/EPs/B-Sides, is exclusive to this release only.

Background
Matt and Bubba Kadane had been performing music together since they were children and they formed Bedhead in Austin, Texas, with the drummer Trini Martinez, the guitarist Tench Coxe and the bass guitarist Kris Wheat in 1991. The group released its first two 7-inch singles through Direct Hit Records in 1992 and 1993 before being signed by the local Austin record label Trance Syndicate in 1993. The group released three albums with the label: WhatFunLifeWas (1994), Beheaded (1996) and Transaction de Novo (1998), as well as the extended plays 4songEP19:10 (1994) and The Dark Ages (1995). Bedhead's music received praise from critics for its style and sound. The band broke up in 1998, shortly after the release of Transaction de Novo.

Reception
On its release, 1992–1998 gained much praise from critics. Pitchfork writer Mark Richardson rewarded the boxset an 8.5 out of a possible 10, as well as giving it "Best New Reissue" status. Fred Thomas of AllMusic rated the set 4.5 out of 5, stating that it "[demands] commitment and close inspection to even begin to crack the veneer of these songs to see the devastating beauty within".

Track list

Personnel
Bedhead
Matt Kadane - guitar, vocals
Bubba Kadane - guitar, vocals
Tench Coxe - guitar
Kris Wheat - bass guitar
Trini Martinez - drums

Production
Paul Quigg - recording, mixing (WhatFunLifeWas)
Adam Wiltzie - recording, mixing (Beheaded)
Steve Albini - recording (Transaction de Novo)
Mark Elliott - recording (Singles/EPs/B-Sides)
Bedhead - recording, production, mixing
Matthew Barnhart - mastering

Artwork and design
Matt Gallaway - liner notes
Henry Owings - art direction
Frank Goodenough - design, graphic assistance
Violet Hopkins - photography
John Maxwell - photography
Josh Robertson - photography
Michelle Coral - photography
Nick Ruth - photography
Patty Rooney - photography

References

External links
 
 Bedhead on Numero Group

2014 compilation albums
Bedhead (band) albums